Franzese is an Italian surname. It is a version of Francese, meaning 'Frenchman'. This surname originates from Campania (Naples region), where it is mainly worn by people from this region
Notable persons with that name include:

 Daniel Franzese (born 1978), American actor
 Francesco Franzese (born 1981), Italian football goalkeeper
 John Franzese (born 1917), Italian-American gangster
 John Franzese Jr., American gangster, son of John 
 Michael Franzese (born 1951), American gangster and motivational speaker, son of John 
 Paula Franzese, American legal scholar
 Pino Franzese, Italian singer of Neomelodic music 

Italian-language surnames
Ethnonymic surnames